Up on the Roof may refer to:

 "Up on the Roof" (song), a song written by Gerry Goffin and Carole King, notably recorded by The Drifters and James Taylor
  Up on the Roof (musical), a musical play, and the film adaptation
 Up on the Roof (TV series), a British children's programme
 "Up on the Roof", a song by The Les Claypool Frog Brigade from Purple Onion
 "Up on the Roof", a story in the Bone comics series, included in the collection The Great Cow Race